Newchapel is a village and former civil parish, now in the parish of Kidsgrove, in the Newcastle-under-Lyme district, in the county of Staffordshire, England. In 1951 the parish had a population of 4135.

Newchapel was originally named Thursfield. It was mentioned in the Domesday Book in 1086 as Turvoldesfeld. After the Reformation in the 17th century the land reverted to private ownership, the new owner built a stone Chapel and the village was renamed Newchapel.

Thursfield was formerly a chapelry in the parish of Wolstanton, On 31 December 1894 it became a civil parish in its own right. From 1894 to 1904 Newchapel formed part of Wolstanton Rural District. After re-organisation of boundaries, from 1904 to 1974 it was part of Kidsgrove Urban District; following the Local Government Act 1972, on 1 April 1974 it was absorbed and became part of the parish of Kidsgrove in the Borough of Newcastle-under-Lyme.

Newchapel was served by a railway station (shared with Goldenhill), Newchapel and Goldenhill on the Potteries Loop, which was opened by the North Staffordshire Railway on 1 October 1874 and closed on 2 March 1964.

The canal engineer James Brindley (1716 – 27 September 1772) died at his Turnhurst estate in Newchapel, within sight of his unfinished Harecastle Tunnel. On 30 September 1772, just nine days after the completion of his Birmingham Canal, he was buried in the churchyard of Newchapel; the present church, St. James, is dedicated to his memory. The grave is marked by a bronze plaque.

During the excavation work for the first Harecastle Tunnel, large amounts of coal were discovered underground.  This led to the development, initially by the Duke of Bridgewater and then by Robert Heath and Sons of a significant mining and coal by-products works known as Birchenwood.  Growing from the Birchenwood Colliery Company founded in 1893, this was the largest industrial site that the Newchapel area has ever known and provided employment for several thousand people in its heyday. Newchapel as seen today was born as a result of the success of Birchenwood, and the first houses built were to provide homes for the workers and their families.

Notable People from Newchapel
Hugh Henshall (1734–1816), civil engineer noted for his work on canals

References

External links 

 Newchapel Village History and photo gallery
 Thursfield History History of Newchapel and the Thursfield family 1500-2000.
 Website of St James Church, Newchapel

Villages in Staffordshire
Former civil parishes in Staffordshire
Kidsgrove